Voletivaripalem is a Mandal in Nellore district of the Indian state of Andhra Pradesh. It is the mandal headquarters of Voletivaripalem mandal  in Kandukur revenue division.

Demographics 

Total population of Voletivaripalem is 3622. Males are 1,805 and females are 1,817.

Politics 
Voletivaripalem falls under Kandukur assembly constituency and Nellore lok sabha constituency.

References 

Villages in Prakasam district
Mandal headquarters in Prakasam district